Ionești is a commune located in Vâlcea County, Oltenia, Romania. It is composed of nine villages: Bucșani, Dealu Mare, Delureni, Fișcălia, Fotești, Guguianca, Ionești, Marcea and Prodănești.

See also
 Castra Pons Aluti

References

Communes in Vâlcea County
Localities in Oltenia